Caitlin Pulli (born May 3, 1975), also known as Caitlin Costello and Caitlin Maroldo, is an American curler. She was a silver medalist at the 2006 World Women's Championship.

Curling career 
Pulli started curling in 1988. She has competed at the United States Women's Championship fourteen times, earning a bronze medal once, four silver medals, and gold in 2011. She was the alternate for Debbie McCormick's team at the 2006 World Women's Championship, where they won the silver medal. Pulli was a longtime teammate for skip Patti Lank, including when they won the US title in 2011. Pulli and Lank, along with Jessica Schultz, and Mackenzie Lank, went through the 2011 Nationals round robin with an 8–1 record, then defeated Allison Pottinger in the final. They represented the US at the 2011 World Championship in Esbjerg, Denmark, where they finished seventh with a record of 6–5.

Teams

Women's

Mixed

References

External links

Living people
1975 births
Sportspeople from Utica, New York
American female curlers
American curling champions
Continental Cup of Curling participants
21st-century American women